ChinaCache is a provider of Internet content and application delivery services in China. It was founded in 1998 by Song Wang. Through its 3-tier Internet ecosystem, ChinaCache offers Internet data center management, Internet Exchange operations and cloud hosting services. ChinaCache's network is interconnected with those operated by the three dominating telecom carriers (China Mobile, China Unicom, China Telecom) and local Internet service providers in China.

The company is headquartered in Beijing, China, with offices in Sunnyvale, CA, Diamond Bar, CA, London, UK, and Hong Kong. In 2017, ChinaCache received National CDN License from the Chinese government.

History
ChinaCache was founded by Song Wang in 1998.

In 2000, ChinaCache received the CDN license from China's Ministry of Industry and Information Technology.

In 2007, ChinaCache North America was established to serve global customers. Its first office is in Diamond Bar, CA, followed by a research and development center in Sunnyvale, opened in 2011.

In October 2010, ChinaCache filed for IPO and became listed on Nasdaq, ticker symbol CCIH.

In 2013, Atecsys Data Center, operated by ChinaCache, was established. Located in Beijing's Tianzhu Free Trade Zone, the data center offers co-location services as well as IP peering through its Internet Exchange Center, CHN-IX. In the same year, ChinaCache opened an office in Hong Kong, expanding service capacities in APAC.

In 2015, ChinaCache opened an office in London, UK.

In September 2019, ChinaCache announced its delisting from the NASDAQ.

ChinaCache Network
ChinaCache maintains more than 500 service nodes in more than 120 major cities globally and across China. Its network in interconnected to China Telecom, China Netcom, China Mobile, China Unicom, China Railcom, China CERNET and various other access providers.

Partnerships

In 2007, ChinaCache received a $31.5 million investment from Intel Capital and Ignition Partners. In the same year, it also announced a partnership with RawFlow, a provider of live peer-to-peer streaming technologies.

In 2008, ChinaCache partnered with Adobe Systems to offer Flash Video Streaming Service in China.

In 2008, ChinaCache announced support for Microsoft Silverlight, a cross-platform and cross-browser plug-in.

In August 2011, ChinaCache announced a partnership with the Shanxi Unicom and Wentian Technology to Build Shanxi's Largest Cloud Computing Data Center to enable facilities including disaster recovery centers, enterprise data centers and Internet data centers.

In 2012, ChinaCache collaborated with Telekom Malaysia, Hutchison Global Communications and Interxion to expand their services in Asia and Europe.

In August 2013, ChinaCache collaborated with Microsoft Corporation, to integrate the company's CDN and other services with Windows Azure China to service customers in China.

In August 2013, ChinaCache announced a partnership with Kingsoft Cloud Group to provide a comprehensive suite of cloud-based network services.

References

Internet technology companies of China
Companies formerly listed on the Nasdaq
Technology companies established in 1998
Content delivery networks
Cloud computing providers
Chinese companies established in 1998
Companies based in Beijing
Chinese brands
2010 initial public offerings